Stockwell is a district in inner South London, England.

Stockwell may also refer to:

Places
Stockwell (ward), an electoral ward of the Lambeth London City Council
Stockwell, Indiana
Stockwell, South Australia

People

Surname
Anthony Stockwell, British historian
Chris Stockwell (1957–2018), Canadian politician
Clifford H. Stockwell (1897–1987), Canadian geologist
Dean Stockwell (1936–2021), American actor
Frank Stockwell (1928–2009), Irish sportsperson
Guy Stockwell (1934–2002), American actor
Harry Stockwell (1902–1984), American actor
Hugh Stockwell (1903–1986), British general
John Stockwell (CIA officer) (born 1937), American spy and activist
John Stockwell (actor) (born 1961), American actor and director
Mark Stockwell (born 1963), Australian swimmer
Mick Stockwell (born 1965), English football player
Peter Stockwell, New Zealand air marshal

Given name
Stockwell Day (born 1950), Canadian politician

Fiction
David Stockwell, fictional character in the television series Heartbeat
Ernest Stockwell, fictional character in the video game Army of Two
Hunt Stockwell, fictional character in the television series The A-Team
Jim Stockwell, fictional character in the television series Queer as Folk

Other uses
Stockwell (horse) (1849–1871), British racehorse
Code name (c. 1950 to 1955) for British Central Government War Headquarters
Stockwell (company), an American company originally called "Bodega"

English toponymic surnames